Juice is a 1992 American crime thriller film directed by Ernest R. Dickerson, and written by Dickerson and Gerard Brown. It stars Omar Epps, Tupac Shakur, Jermaine Hopkins and Khalil Kain. The film touches on the lives of four black youths growing up in Harlem, following their day-to-day activities, their struggles with police harassment, rival neighborhood gangs and their families. 

The film is the writing and directing debut of Dickerson and features Shakur in his acting debut. The film was shot in New York City, mainly in the Harlem area, in 1991.

Plot
Roland Bishop, Quincy "Q" Powell, Raheem Porter, and Eric "Steel" Thurman are four teenage African-American friends growing up together in Harlem. They regularly skip school, instead spending their days hanging out at Steel's apartment, at a neighborhood arcade, and also a record store where they steal LPs for Q's DJ interests. They are also harassed daily by the police and a Puerto Rican gang led by Radames.

Fed up with the harassment he and his friends have endured, Bishop decides that the group must go on to do bigger things in order to win respect. However, Q is unsure if he wants to become involved in a life of crime. One night, under Bishop's persistence, the friends decide to rob a local convenience store owned by Fernando Quiles.

However, Q is unsure of the plan, and also fears that it will affect his chances of participating in a DJ competition which he has yearned to compete in for years, although he is eventually pressured by his friends. During the robbery, Bishop fatally shoots Quiles in the head, and the group flees the scene.

The four then gather in an abandoned building where they argue over the evening's events; Q, Raheem and Steel are angry at Bishop for killing Quiles, and Raheem demands that Bishop give the gun to him. However, Bishop resists, and a struggle ensues before Bishop shoots Raheem dead. Panicking, Bishop, Q and Steel flee to another building, where Bishop threatens to kill Q and Steel if they reveal to anybody that he murdered Raheem.

Q and Steel realize that Bishop is beginning to become addicted to the thrill of killing, and they agree to give Bishop as wide a berth as possible. However, while attending Raheem's funeral, they find Bishop there, who goes as far as to comfort Raheem's mother (Lauren Jones) and promise to find his killer. While Q and Steel are mostly able to avoid Bishop, he eventually finds and confronts them, questioning their loyalty.

Later, Bishop confronts and kills Radames, then plans to frame Q for his murders in order to cover his tracks. Fearful of Bishop, Q resorts to buying a gun for his own protection. Meanwhile, Bishop confronts Steel in an alley, accusing him of disloyalty, and shoots him. However, Steel survives the attack and is rushed to the hospital, where he informs Q's girlfriend Yolanda about Bishop and his plan to frame Q. Frustrated with the troubles brought upon him, Q throws his gun into the river and decides to confront Bishop unarmed. Q and Bishop meet, where a fight and a chase ensue.

Q is subsequently chased into a building where a party is being held, where Bishop begins firing into a group of partygoers in an attempt to hit Q, but Q escapes unharmed. Q manages to disarm Bishop while he is distracted, and he pursues Bishop to a roof of a high-rise building. As the two get into a physical altercation, Bishop eventually falls off the ledge, but is caught by Q. Bishop begs Q not to let go, but Q eventually loses his grip, and Bishop falls to his death.

As Q is leaving the rooftop, a crowd from the party gathers to see what happened. One of the people in the crowd turns to Q and says, "Yo, you got the juice now, man." Q turns to look at him, shakes his head in disgust, and walks away.

Alternate Ending
In the alternate ending, instead of Bishop accidentally falling to his death, he purposely decides to let go after hearing approaching police sirens.

Cast

Production
The movie was filmed between March and April 1991. Daryl Mitchell, Treach, Money-B, and Donald Faison had auditioned for the role of Roland Bishop, but none were considered right for the role. Tupac Shakur accompanied Money-B to the audition and asked producer Neal H. Moritz to read. He was given 15 minutes to rehearse before his audition, and ultimately secured the role of Roland Bishop. Treach and Faison landed cameo roles as a rival gang member and a high school student, respectively.

Reception
The film received generally favorable reviews. Roger Ebert gave the film three out of four stars, praising the film as "one of those stories with the quality of a nightmare, in which foolish young men try to out-macho one another until they get trapped in a violent situation which will forever alter their lives.". Entertainment Weekly gave the film a "B+" grading, based on how it depicts four young characters who try to gain complete self-control over their surroundings.

Dickerson also received praise for his directorial skills:

Juice holds a rating of 79% on Rotten Tomatoes based on 29 reviews.

Soundtrack

See also
 List of hood films
 Boyz n the Hood
 Menace II Society
 New Jack City

References

External links
 
 
 
 

1992 films
1992 crime drama films
1992 crime thriller films
1992 independent films
American independent films
American crime drama films
American crime thriller films
1990s English-language films
African-American films
American chase films
1990s hip hop films
Hood films
Paramount Pictures films
Original Film films
Films directed by Ernest Dickerson
Films set in New York City
Films produced by Neal H. Moritz
Films produced by David Heyman
Films produced by Peter Frankfurt
1992 directorial debut films
1992 drama films
1990s American films